Catacoeloceras is a genus of ammonite that lived during Middle Toarcian stage of early Jurassic. Members of this genus existed from Bifrons Subzone of Bifrons Zone to Variabilis Zone. Their fossils were found in Europe, northern Africa, Asia, North America and South America. It has evolved from Porpoceras.

Description
Ammonites belonging to this genus have cadicone shells with depressed, rounded whorl section. Some species have almost spheroconic shells and these ones were designated as genus Transicoeloceras, which is considered to be a synonym of Catacoeloceras by some authors, while sometimes it is considered to be a valid genus. Ribs can be both simple or bifurcating. In the case of most of the species, ventrolateral tubercules are present. On body chamber, between tubercules, venter can be smooth and flat. Before mouth border, there is constriction. Size dimorphism is present in this genus. Genus Mucrodactylites is considered to be a microconch.

References

Dactylioceratidae
Toarcian life
Early Jurassic ammonites of Europe
Ammonites of Africa
Ammonites of Asia
Ammonites of North America
Ammonites of South America
Ammonitida genera